Saint-Agapit is a municipality in the Municipalité régionale de comté de Lotbinière in Quebec, Canada. It is part of the Chaudière-Appalaches region and the population is 4,280 as of 2016. It is named after Pope Agapetus I.

Saint-Agapit is the hometown of Anaheim Ducks forward Antoine Vermette, who brought the Stanley Cup to the town in July 2015 after winning it while playing for Chicago.  Film director Richard Roy's childhood in Saint-Agapit was the inspiration for his autobiographical 2011 film, Frisson des Collines.

Demographics
Population trend:
 Population in 2016: 4,280 (2011 to 2016 population change: 20.0%)
 Population in 2011: 3,567 (2006 to 2011 population change: 20.3%)
 Population in 2006: 2,965
 Population in 2001: 2,906
 Population in 1996: 2,913
 Population in 1991: 2,980
 Population in 1986: 2,943
 Population in 1981: 2,954
 Population in 1976: 2,748
 Population in 1971: 2,558
 Population in 1966: 2,399
 Population in 1961: 2,237
 Population in 1956: 2,068
 Population in 1951: 1,787
 Population in 1941: 1,450
 Population in 1931: 1,205
 Population in 1921: 1,129
 Population in 1911: 1,109
 Population in 1901: 1,094
 Population in 1891: 1,001
 Population in 1881: 854
 Population in 1871: 657

Private dwellings occupied by usual residents: 1,780 (total dwellings: 1,842)

References

Commission de toponymie du Québec
Ministère des Affaires municipales, des Régions et de l'Occupation du territoire

Municipalities in Quebec
Incorporated places in Chaudière-Appalaches
Lotbinière Regional County Municipality